The Federal Correctional Institution, Elkton (FCI Elkton) is a low-security United States federal prison for male inmates near Elkton, Ohio. It is operated by the Federal Bureau of Prisons, a division of the United States Department of Justice. It also has an adjacent satellite prison camp that houses low and minimum-security male inmates.

It is located in Elkrun Township, Columbiana County.

FCI Elkton is located in central Columbiana County, Ohio and is 45 miles northwest of Pittsburgh, Pennsylvania.

Notable incidents
In 2010, a federal grand jury in Cleveland, Ohio, charged FCI Elkton inmate William J. Platz, age 61, with drawing and distributing visual depictions of minors engaged in sexually explicit conduct to another inmate between August 2007 and April 2008. Platz was already serving an 11-year sentence for a child pornography conviction in 2000 and was a co-conspirator with Eric Rosser. Rosser was an FBI Ten Most Wanted Fugitive until his capture in 2001. Platz subsequently pleaded guilty and was sentenced to additional prison time, which he served at the Federal Correctional Institution, Seagoville, a low-security facility in Texas. He was released in 2016.

Notable inmates (current and former)

See also

List of U.S. federal prisons
Federal Bureau of Prisons
Incarceration in the United States

References 

Prisons in Ohio
Buildings and structures in Columbiana County, Ohio
Elkton